Sheikh Ahmed bin Saqr Al Qassimi is Chairman of the Ras Al Khaimah Department of Customs and Seaports.

He purchased a 60% stake in an unnamed British Premier League football club in June 2009.

References

Sheikhs of the Emirate of Ras Al Khaimah
Year of birth missing (living people)
Living people
Ahmed